Gernon Bushes is a 32 hectare nature reserve north-east of Epping in Essex. It is managed by the Essex Wildlife Trust. It is part of the Epping Forest Site of Special Scientific Interest and Nature Conservation Review site.

This site is ancient coppice, with old hornbeam pollards, and many ponds which were formerly created for gravel extraction. There are areas of marsh with large patches of the unusual marsh fern, and other plants include marsh marigold and ragged robin.

There is access to the site from Coopersale village.

References

 Essex Wildlife Trust